Rafailia Spanoudaki-Hatziriga (born 7 June 1994), is a Greek sprinter. She competed in the 60 metres event at the 2018 and 2022 World Athletics Indoor Championships, and the 100 metres and 200 metres at the 2020 Summer Olympics.

Competition record

References

1994 births
Living people
Greek female sprinters
Mediterranean Games silver medalists for Greece
Mediterranean Games medalists in athletics
Athletes (track and field) at the 2018 Mediterranean Games
Athletes (track and field) at the 2019 European Games
European Games medalists in athletics
European Games bronze medalists for Greece
Athletes (track and field) at the 2020 Summer Olympics
Olympic female sprinters
Olympic athletes of Greece
People from Rhodes
Sportspeople from the South Aegean
21st-century Greek women